P. domesticus may refer to:
 Passer domesticus, the house sparrow, a bird species
 Phytoseius domesticus, Rather, 1985, a mite species in the genus Phytoseius and the family Phytoseiidae
 Prodidomus domesticus, Lessert, 1938, a spider species in the genus Prodidomus and the family Prodidomidae found in Congo

See also
 Domesticus (disambiguation)